Oshakati is a village in Ondobe Constituency, Namibia. It is one of the village that suffered from colonial era and had a hospital which was destroyed by the Boers. It is situated between the three villages, Ohainengena at south side, Omungholyo on east side and Omakelo on west side.

Populated places in the Ohangwena Region